Monty Ted Fariss (born October 13, 1967) is an American former professional baseball player who spent time in the Major League Baseball (MLB) as an outfielder from 1991 to 1993.

Career
Fariss attended Oklahoma State, and in 1987 he played collegiate summer baseball with the Hyannis Mets of the Cape Cod Baseball League. He was selected in the first round of the 1988 MLB Draft by the Texas Rangers. 

Fariss made his first MLB appearance in 1991, and in his two years as a Ranger he had 197 at bats. In 1993, he was signed by the Florida Marlins and played in 18 games for the club.

References

External links

1967 births
Living people
All-American college baseball players
American expatriate baseball players in Canada
Baseball players from Oklahoma
Butte Copper Kings players
Edmonton Trappers players
Florida Marlins players
Hyannis Harbor Hawks players
Iowa Cubs players
Major League Baseball left fielders
Oklahoma City 89ers players
Oklahoma State Cowboys baseball players
People from Washita County, Oklahoma
Texas Rangers players
Tulsa Drillers players
Mat-Su Miners players
Sultanes de Monterrey players
American expatriate baseball players in Mexico